Things Viral is the second album by American drone metal band Khanate, released in 2003 on the Southern Lord label.

The CD was released in two versions: a European digipack version and a U.S. jewelcase version.  There was also an LP version on LOAD Records with 1000 gatefold plus 12" copies released.

A video was made for the song "Dead".

Track listing

CD tracks
All Songs Written & Arranged By Khanate.  (Copyright Ideologic Organ)
"Commuted"  – 19:13
"Fields"  – 19:50
"Dead"  – 9:27
"Too Close Enough To Touch"  – 11:11

LP tracks
"Commuted"
"Fields"
"Too Close Enough To Touch"
"Commuted (coda)"

Personnel
Alan Dubin: Vocal
Stephen O'Malley: Guitars
James Plotkin: Bass, Keyboards, Synthesizers
Tim Wyskida: Drums, Percussion

Production
Produced, Recorded, Engineered & Mixed By James Plotkin

References

External links
"Things Viral" at discogs

2003 albums
Southern Lord Records albums
Khanate (band) albums
Albums produced by James Plotkin